Pankaj Bora (born 6 March 1946 in Guwahati, District Kamrup (Assam)) is an Indian social worker, politician and a Member of Parliament (Rajya Sabha) elected from Assam, India being an Indian National Congress candidate.

He completed BA from Cotton College at Guwahati in 1967.

References

Living people
Rajya Sabha members from Assam
1946 births
People from Kamrup district
Indian National Congress politicians
Assam MLAs 2011–2016
State cabinet ministers of Assam
Indian National Congress politicians from Assam